The following is a list of ecoregions in Mauritania, according to the Worldwide Fund for Nature (WWF).

Terrestrial ecoregions

Tropical and subtropical grasslands, savannas, and shrublands

 Sahelian Acacia savanna
 West Sudanian savanna

Flooded grasslands and savannas

 Saharan halophytics

Deserts and xeric shrublands

 Atlantic coastal desert
 North Saharan steppe and woodlands
 Sahara desert
 South Saharan steppe and woodlands
 West Saharan montane xeric woodlands

Freshwater ecoregions
 Dry Sahel
 Senegal-Gambia Catchments
 Temporary Maghreb

Marine ecoregions
 Sahelian Upwelling

References
 Burgess, Neil, Jennifer D’Amico Hales, Emma Underwood (2004). Terrestrial Ecoregions of Africa and Madagascar: A Conservation Assessment. Island Press, Washington DC.
 Spalding, Mark D., Helen E. Fox, Gerald R. Allen, Nick Davidson et al. "Marine Ecoregions of the World: A Bioregionalization of Coastal and Shelf Areas". Bioscience Vol. 57 No. 7, July/August 2007, pp. 573–583.
 Thieme, Michelle L. (2005). Freshwater Ecoregions of Africa and Madagascar: A Conservation Assessment. Island Press, Washington DC.

 
Mauritania
Ecoregions